The 1924 King's Birthday Honours in New Zealand, celebrating the official birthday of King George V, were appointments made by the King on the recommendation of the New Zealand government to various orders and honours to reward and highlight good works by New Zealanders. They were announced on 3 June 1924.

The recipients of honours are displayed here as they were styled before their new honour.

Knight Bachelor
 James Henry Gunson  – mayor of the City of Auckland. In recognition of his public services.
 The Honourable William Alexander Sim – judge of the Supreme Court.

Order of Saint Michael and Saint George

Companion (CMG)
 Alexander Francis Lowe – clerk of Parliaments and clerk of the Legislative Council.

Order of the British Empire

Commander (CBE)
Civil division
 Donald George Clark  – commissioner of taxes.
 George Frederick Copus – finance officer in the office of the high commissioner in London for New Zealand.

Companion of the Imperial Service Order (ISO)
 Arthur Thomas Bothamley – clerk assistant of the Legislative Council and Gentleman Usher of the Black Rod.

References

Birthday Honours
1924 awards
1924 in New Zealand
New Zealand awards